Jordan Clarke (born July 21, 1950) is an American actor.

Life and career 
Clarke was born in Webster, New York. He attended Cornell and trained as an actor at New York University. 

Clarke made a number of guest appearances on shows in the late 1970s and early 1980s, including MASH, CHiPs, The Paper Chase, Law & Order, Spenser: For Hire, and Miami Vice. He also played the role of Son Slater in an episode of The Waltons.

Guiding Light
Clarke had two high-profile roles on the CBS soap opera, Guiding Light. The first role, Dr. Tim Ryan, ran from 1974 to 1976.

He is perhaps best known for his second GL role, as Billy Lewis. He played Billy on and off from the character's debut in 1982 to the show's end in 2009. In 2006, he received his first nomination and won his first Daytime Emmy for "Best Supporting Actor in a Drama Series" for his work on GL, an especially notable victory as he was not a contract player on the show at the time.

Other roles
He has appeared in the web soap Venice: The Series with former Guiding Light costar Crystal Chappell. Clarke plays the father of Chappell's character on the show. Clarke had a mild stroke during the first season of Venice, but has since recovered. 

Clarke's life and career was the focus of a 2015 BuzzFeed article, "My Handyman, My Soap Star." Writer David Kushner covered several years where Clarke worked as a handyman and helped Kushner repair his new home, all while still making appearances on Guiding Light.

References

External links

1950 births
Living people
American male soap opera actors
Daytime Emmy Award winners
Daytime Emmy Award for Outstanding Supporting Actor in a Drama Series winners
Cornell University alumni
Male actors from Rochester, New York